Ali Jadbabaie is an Iranian-American systems scientist and decision theorist and the JR East Professor of Engineering at Massachusetts Institute of Technology. Prior to joining MIT, he was the Alfred Fitler Moore Professor of Network Science in the Department of Electrical and Systems Engineering at the University of Pennsylvania and a postdoc at the department of Electrical and Computer Engineering at Yale University under A. Stephen Morse (2001–2002). Jadbabaie is an internationally renowned expert in the control and coordination of multi-robot formations, distributed optimization, network economics, and network science. He is currently the head of the Civil and Environmental Engineering Department at MIT. Previously he served as the Associate director of the Institute for Data, Systems and Society (IDSS) at MIT and was  the program Head for the Social and Engineering Systems PhD program.  He was a cofounder and director of the Singh Program in Networked & Social Systems Engineering (NETS) at the University of Pennsylvania's School of Engineering and Applied Sciences.

Education
 Ph.D. Control and Dynamical Systems, October 2000, California Institute of Technology, Pasadena, CA, USA
 M.S. Electrical Engineering, December 1997, University of New Mexico, Albuquerque, NM, USA
 B.S. Electrical Engineering, February 1995, Sharif University of Technology, Tehran, Iran

References

External links
 Home page

Control theorists
Iranian roboticists
Sharif University of Technology alumni
Living people
American roboticists
Fellow Members of the IEEE
Year of birth missing (living people)